Eighteen male athletes were representing Iraq at the 1992 Summer Paralympics in Barcelona, Spain.

See also
1992 Summer Paralympics

References 

Nations at the 1992 Summer Paralympics
Paralympics
1992